Paweł Piotrowski (born 24 September 1985) is a Paralympian athlete from Poland competing mainly in category F35-36 throwing events.

Paweł competed in the shot put, discus and javelin in both the 2004 and 2008 summer Paralympics.  He won the gold medal in the F36 shot and the silver in the F36/38 javelin in 2004 and in 2008 he won the silver in the F35/36 javelin and the bronze in the F35/36 shot put.

External links
 
 Pekin/paraolimpiada - Mamy medale! Piotrowski srebro, Zielińska brąz at Sport.pl

Paralympic athletes of Poland
Athletes (track and field) at the 2004 Summer Paralympics
Athletes (track and field) at the 2008 Summer Paralympics
Athletes (track and field) at the 2012 Summer Paralympics
Paralympic gold medalists for Poland
Paralympic silver medalists for Poland
Paralympic bronze medalists for Poland
Living people
Place of birth missing (living people)
1985 births
Polish male shot putters
Polish male discus throwers
Polish male javelin throwers
Medalists at the 2004 Summer Paralympics
Medalists at the 2008 Summer Paralympics
Paralympic medalists in athletics (track and field)
21st-century Polish people
20th-century Polish people